Bedřich John (date of birth unknown, died between 1940 and 1945) was a Czech equestrian. He competed in two events at the 1924 Summer Olympics.

References

External links
 

Year of birth missing
1940s deaths
Czech male equestrians
Olympic equestrians of Czechoslovakia
Equestrians at the 1924 Summer Olympics
Place of birth missing